Steven Van Broeckhoven (27 September 1985) is a Belgian windsurfer, specialized in freestyle. In 2010 he was ranked #4 on the PWA overall ranking Freestyle Men.

Training 
Steven Van Broeckhoven had his first windsurfing experiences at the Vossemeren in Lommel, Belgium. After learning the basics, he started windsurfing at Lake Grevelingen in the Netherlands. Nowadays he trains at Tarifa, Kaapstad and Bonaire, but still refers to Lake Grevelingen as his homespot.

Major achievements 
2006
 1st Belgian Championship Freestyle Men
 1st overall "Sultans of Surf Marokko" Men
 4th Pro Kids Bonaire Men
2007
 1st Overall "O'Neill The Crowning"
 1st Dutch Championship Freestyle Try Out Men
 1st Belgian Championship Freestyle Men
 1st TWF (Tarifa-Spain)
2008
 1st Dutch Championship Freestyle men
 1st Overall "O'Neill The Crowning 2"
 4th EFPT overall
2009
 1st EFPT overall
 4th PWA (Worldcup) Sotavento Fuerteventura
 6th PWA Costa Teguise, Lanzarote
2010
 1st EFPT overall
 2nd PWA/EFPT Surf Worldcup Podersdorf, Austria
 3rd PWA Super Grand Slam, Colgate World Cup Sylt, Germany
 3rd PWA Freestyle Grand Slam, Sotavento
 3rd PWA Grand Slam, Sotavento Fuerteventura
2011
 1st PWA Surf World Cup Podersdorf, Austria
 1st PWA Surf World Cup Freestyle, overall ; WORLDCHAMPION

Recognition 
In 2009 Steven Van Broeckhoven was elected as Rookie of the Year by the PWA and in 2011 he won the Zilveren Laurier, which symbolizes the sportsman of the year of Limburg. He was also nominated Yachtsman of the year 2010. On May 4, 2011 Steven Van Broeckhoven has won his first PWA World Cup title.
2011 1st PWA Freestyle, overall

References

External links 
 EFPT Profile
 Official website
 

1985 births
Living people
People from Lommel
Windsurfers